Papua New Guinea Netball Federation was created in the 1960s. There are over 10,000 registered netball players in the country. A large support base for the sport exists around Port Moresby.

England's record against Papua New Guinea in international matched between 1949 and 1976 was one win and zero losses.  England beat Papua New Guinea 114–16 at the World Tournament in 1975.

At Gay Games VI, a transgender netball from Papua New Guinea competed.

Some of the top performances for the Papua New Guinea national netball team include:
 2008 Nations Cup: First

As of January 2011, the women's national team was ranked number seventeen in the world.

References

Bibliography